David Andrew Liti (born 11 July 1996) is a New Zealand weightlifter, who won the gold medal in the +105 kg event at the 2018 Commonwealth Games. His total lift of 403 kg was a Commonwealth Games record.

At the Games' closing ceremony, Liti was presented with the David Dixon Award for sportsmanship shown towards his injured weightlifting rival Lauititi Lui.

He represented New Zealand at the 2020 Summer Olympics in Tokyo, Japan, finishing fifth in the men's +109 kg event.

In December 2022, he was elected as member of the IWF Athletes' Commission.

References

External links
 
 
 
 

1996 births
Living people
New Zealand male weightlifters
Commonwealth Games gold medallists for New Zealand
Commonwealth Games silver medallists for New Zealand
Weightlifters at the 2018 Commonwealth Games
Weightlifters at the 2022 Commonwealth Games
Commonwealth Games medallists in weightlifting
Weightlifters at the 2020 Summer Olympics
Olympic weightlifters of New Zealand
21st-century New Zealand people
Medallists at the 2018 Commonwealth Games
Medallists at the 2022 Commonwealth Games